The following radio stations broadcast on FM frequency 97.1 MHz:

Brasil

Radio família Rio de Janeiro

Argentina
 Alfa in Zárate, Buenos Aires
 LRM743 FM Funes in Funes, Santa Fe
 Radio María in Canals, Córdoba

Australia
 Radio National in Port Macquarie, New South Wales
 Radio National in Young, New South Wales
 Radio National in Jindabyne, New South Wales
 Rebel FM in Stanthorpe, Queensland
 Triple J in Cairns, Queensland
Triple J in Emerald, Queensland
 3MDR in Melbourne, Victoria
 3GLR in Orbost, Victoria
 Radio National in Kalgoorlie, Western Australia

Canada
 CBHL-FM in Liverpool, Nova Scotia
 CBL-FM-4 in Owen Sound, Ontario
 CBON-FM-25 in Timmins, Ontario
 CBTB-FM in Baie Verte, Newfoundland and Labrador
 CFIL-FM in Gillam, Manitoba
 CHLC-FM in Baie-Comeau, Quebec
 CHLX-FM in Gatineau, Quebec
 CIBM-FM-4 in Saint-Juste-du-Lac, Quebec
 CIGL-FM in Belleville, Ontario
 CITB-FM in Thunder Bay, Ontario
 CJBP-FM in Neepawa, Manitoba
 CJMG-FM in Penticton, British Columbia
 CKDR-FM in Sioux Lookout and Red Lake, Ontario
 CKFI-FM in Swift Current, Saskatchewan
 CKRO-FM in Inkerman, New Brunswick
 VF2064 in Fort St. James, British Columbia
 VF2066 in Dease Lake, British Columbia
 VF2121 in Lampman, Saskatchewan
 VF2135 in Kitseguecla, British Columbia
 VF2171 in Skidegate, British Columbia
 VF2173 in Alexandria Reserve, British Columbia
 VF2232 in New Bella Bella, British Columbia
 VF2236 in Decker Lake Indian Reserve, British Columbia
 VF2328 in Revelstoke, British Columbia
 VF2539 in Spences Bridge, British Columbia
 VF2571 in McBride, British Columbia

China
 CNR Music Radio in Beihai
 CNR The Voice of China in Hohhot and Jiayuguan
 FM97.1 Shenzhen Media Group 97.1 FM

Indonesia
 FM97.1 Radio Dangdut Indonesia 97.1 FM in Jakarta, Indonesia

Malaysia
 Sinar in Alor Setar, Kedah, Perlis & Penang
 TraXX FM in Tawau, Sabah

Mexico
 XEBA-FM in Guadalajara, Jalisco
 XHCHH-FM in Zumpango del Río, Guerrero
 XHHLL-FM in Salina Cruz, Oaxaca
 XHHQ-FM in Hermosillo, Sonora
 XHKY-FM in Huixtla, Chiapas
 XHNLO-FM in Nuevo Laredo, Tamaulipas
 XHPACP-FM in Acatlán de Osorio, Puebla
 XHPE-FM in Torreón, Coahuila
 XHPEEI-FM in Ciudad Acuña, Coahuila
 XHPNIM-FM in Nueva Italia, Michoacán
 XHPU-FM in Monclova, Coahuila
 XHQB-FM in Tulancingo, Hidalgo
 XHRQ-FM in San Juan del Río, Querétaro
 XHVU-FM in Mazatlán, Sinaloa
 XHZC-FM in Río Grande, Zacatecas

Philippines
DWLS in Manila
DWGB in Legazpi City
DYLS-FM in Cebu City
DXUR in Davao City

Taiwan
 City FM  in Tainan

United Kingdom
Heart East from Ipswich, Suffolk
Heart West from Chard, South West England

United States 
 KALS (FM) in Kalispell, Montana
 KAMD-FM in Camden, Arkansas
 KAWU-LP in El Paso, Texas
  in Warsaw, Missouri
 KAYV in Crested Butte, Colorado
 KBCQ-FM in Roswell, New Mexico
 KBDJ-LP in Waterloo, Iowa
 KBTK in Kachina Village, Arizona
 KCHP-LP in Arcata, California
 KCMI in Terrytown, Nebraska
 KCSA-LP in San Angelo, Texas
  in Moab, Utah
 KEGL in Fort Worth, Texas
  in North Platte, Nebraska
 KFND-LP in Rapid City, South Dakota
 KFTK-FM in Florissant, Missouri
 KHUU in Hughes, Alaska
 KIBB in Haven, Kansas
  in Calico Rock, Arkansas
  in Billings, Montana
  in Duncan, Oklahoma
 KMMA in Green Valley, Arizona
 KNAK-LP in Naknek, Alaska
  in Hilo, Hawaii
 KNX-FM in Los Angeles, California
 KOYT-LP in Anza, California
 KPFE-LP in Corpus Christi, Texas
  in Faith, South Dakota
 KRTO in Guadalupe, California
  in Visalia, California
 KSMR-LP in Great Falls, Montana
  in Minneapolis, Minnesota
 KTHT in Cleveland, Texas
  in Patterson, California
  in Ukiah, California
  in Haskell, Texas
 KVVL in Maryville, Missouri
 KXCP-LP in Palm Desert, California
 KXPT in Las Vegas, Nevada
  in Walla Walla, Washington
  in Muskogee, Oklahoma
  in Portland, Oregon
  in Crookston, Minnesota
  in Minot, North Dakota
 KZBR in La Jara, Colorado
  in Salt Lake City, Utah
 WASH (FM) in Washington, DC
  in Ocean Pines, Maryland
  in Bangor, Maine
  in Mountain Top, Pennsylvania
  in Columbus, Ohio
  in Coal Grove, Ohio
  in Sparta, Wisconsin
  in Sutton, West Virginia
  in Chicago, Illinois
 WEOZ-LP in Loudon, Tennessee
 WEPL-LP in Rochester, New York
 WEZB in New Orleans, Louisiana
 WGJC in University Park, Pennsylvania
 WGLQ in Escanaba, Michigan
  in Memphis, Tennessee
 WICE-LP in Hendersonville, North Carolina
 WIXL-LP in Madison, Wisconsin
 WJGR-LP in Mobile, Alabama
 WJQQ in Somerset, Kentucky
 WJVE-LP in Debary, Florida
 WKHC in Hatteras, North Carolina
 WLHK in Shelbyville, Indiana
  in Frostburg, Maryland
 WLVN-LP in Fort Valley, Georgia
  in Belle Meade, Tennessee
 WMLO-LP in Live Oak, Florida
 WMSF-LP in Mayo, Florida
  in Meridian, Mississippi
  in Indian River Shores, Florida
 WOXX in Colebrook, New Hampshire
 WPCX-LP in Clinton, South Carolina
 WQHT in New York, New York
 WQMG in Greensboro, North Carolina
  in Ashtabula, Ohio
 WSRV in Gainesville, Georgia
 WSUN in Holiday, Florida
 WTAQ-FM in Two Rivers, Wisconsin
 WTSY-LP in Port Gibson, Mississippi
 WTYX-LP in Titusville, Florida
 WURY-LP in Phenix City, Alabama
 WVGT-LP in Mount Dora, Florida
 WVHY in Axson, Georgia
  in Millbrook, Alabama
 WWWR-LP in Wadsworth, Ohio
  in Whitesville, Kentucky
 WXOX-LP in Louisville, Kentucky
  in Detroit, Michigan
 WZHD in Canaseraga, New York
  in Rutland, Vermont

References

Lists of radio stations by frequency